is the historic and current main road between former Itsukaichi (now Akiruno) and Suginami in Tokyo's central suburbs.  It generally follows the same road as the Suginami Akiruno Line along Tokyo Metropolitan Road Route 7 (ja).

Overview 
After Tokugawa Ieyasu entered Edo, he developed Itsukaichi Kaidō for the purpose of transporting timber and charcoal from Itukaichi (now Akiruno) and Hinohara. Initially, the road was called "Ina Road", after Ina, a settlement not far east of Itsukaichi.  Ina was the source of stones used for restoring Edo Castle and the road developed for transport between these two places. After the restoration of Edo Castle was finished, charcoal became the main product transported and Itsukaichi grew to become more significant than Ina.

As land was opened up on the Musashino Plateau, the road between the Tama district and Edo developed as one highway.

Main Locations

Suginami 
 Shin-koenji Station
 Tokyo Metropolitan Toyotama High School
 Kanto Baus Itsukaichi Kaido Depot
 Zempukuji River Park
 Takaido Police Station
 Tokyo Metropolitan Nishi High School
 Nishi-Ogikubo Station

Musashino 
 Kichijōji Station
 Fujimura Girls' Junior and Senior High School
 Seikei Gakuen School Corporation (Seikei University, Seikei Junior and Senior High School, Seikei Elementary School)
 Kanto Bus Musashino Depot

Nishitokyo 
 Musashino University (Musashino Joshi Gakuin)

Koganei 
 Hosei University Koganei Campus
 Koganei Park

Kodaira 
 Bunka Gakuen University Kodaira Campus
 Kodaira Apartment Complex
 Japan Ground Self-Defense Force Camp Kodaira
 Hitotsubashi-Gakuen Station

Kokubunji

Tachikawa 
 Keyakidai Apartment Complex
 Sunagawa-Nanaban Station
 Showa Memorial Park
 Musashi-Sunagawa Station
 Seibu-Tachikawa Station
 Matsunaka Apartment Complex

Akishima 
 Haijima Station

Fussa 
 Yokota Air Base (United States Forces Japan Yokota Base)
 Ushihama Station

Akiruno 
 Akirudai Park
 Akigawa Station
 Musashi-Itsukaichi Station
 Nishi Tokyo Bus Itsukaichi Depot

See also
 Tokyo Metropolitan Road Route 7 (ja)
 Ōme Kaidō
 Edo Five Routes

References

External links
Itsukaichi Kaidō Cycling
Walking the Itsukaichi Kaidō
Itsukaichi Kaidō Log

Roads in Tokyo
Roads in Japan